Violet Awindi Barasa (June 21, 1975, Sikhendu village, Bungoma District, Kenya – February 12, 2007, Webuye) was a volleyball player from Kenya. Her surname is sometimes spelled as Baraza.

She was a long-time captain for the Kenyan women's national volleyball team. Baraza represented Kenya in the 2000 and 2004 Olympic Games, three times in the World Championship and in numerous continental events.

Life
Barasa was born in 1975 and she attended Lugulu High School which is known for its support for volleyball. She began by playing volleyball for the Kenya Commercial Bank and from there she was included in Kenya women's national volleyball team.

She was one of the few Kenyan players to play professional volleyball abroad, for Al Ahly in Egypt, Vileo and Unic-Romania in Romania, Panellinios  in Greece and Dicle University in Turkey.

As national team captain she led the national team to its appearances at the 2000 Summer Olympics and the 2004 Summer Olympics.

She died in February 2007 at the Webuye District Hospital of undisclosed causes. At the time of her death, she was still an active player with the Kenya Commercial Bank volleyball club, although she had been dropped from the national team. After her death volleyball matches were postponed in Kenya until after her funeral as a mark of respect.

References 

1975 births
2007 deaths
Kenyan women's volleyball players
Kenyan Luhya people
Olympic volleyball players of Kenya
Volleyball players at the 2000 Summer Olympics
Volleyball players at the 2004 Summer Olympics